Troy Area School District is a small, rural, public school district located in Bradford County, Pennsylvania. It covers the boroughs of Troy, Burlington, Sylvania and Alba and Wells Township, South Creek Township, Columbia Township, Springfield Township, Armenia Township, Troy Township, West Burlington Township, Burlington Township and Granville Township in Bradford County, Pennsylvania. According to 2000 federal census data, it serves a resident population of 10,410. In 2009, the district residents’ per capita income was $15,806 while the median family income was $39,780. In the Commonwealth, the median family income was $49,501 and the United States median family income was $49,445, in 2010.

Troy Area School District operates Troy Area Junior Senior High School (7th–12th grades), Troy Intermediate School (3rd–6th grades) and WR Croman Elementary School (kindergarten-2nd grade). Formerly the district operated three elementary schools (K-4th), one middle school (5th-8th), and one senior high school, grades 9-12. Mosherville Elementary School and Troy Elementary School East were closed at the end of the 2011-12 school year. The rest of the schools were realigned. The 7th and 8th grade were added to the high school creating a junior senior high school. The school alignment changes were adopted to deal with a $2.3 million budget shortfall.

Extracurriculars
The district offers a variety of clubs, activities and sports.

Clubs
Speech and Debate
Robotics
National Honor Society
AV Senior High School
Student High Schools JHS, HS
FBLA
German American Partnership Program

Sports
Football HS, JHS, ES
Basketball (Boys and Girls) HS, JHS, ES
Volleyyball HS, JHS, ES
Wrestling HS, JHS, ES
Cross Country Track
Track and Field
Soccer Boys and Girls
Cheerleading
Baseball
Softball

The district also pays teachers to run an extensive intramural program for the elementary students

References

School districts in Bradford County, Pennsylvania